Pak Shek Kok is a place in Tai Po District in Hong Kong, located between Ma Liu Shui and Tai Po Kau, close to Cheung Shue Tan and facing Tolo Harbour (Tai Po Hoi). The Kowloon–Canton Railway, Tolo Highway, Hong Kong Science Park are all situated on the reclamation outside Pak Shek Kok.

Geography
Pak Shek Kok was the estuary of two creeks from nearby valleys of Cheung Shue Tau. Kok in Cantonese means convex land on the shore and thus was used to describe the land formed by two creeks running into Tai Po Hoi. Pak Shek means white rock. It is probably the feature of land but without well documentary.

The estuary was completely covered by reclamation and the mouth of creeks was redirect to a drainage.

Politics
The proper Pak Shek Kok and surrounding villages are within Tai Po District. As it is close to the border of Sha Tin District, the reclamation off Pak Shek Kok divides. Most of Hong Kong Science Park belongs to Sha Tin and the rest belongs to Tai Po.

Development
In January 2013, the government issued a proposal to develop Pak Shek Kok (East) for residential use, under Outline Zoning Plan S/PSK/10.
Associated is a proposed rail station, Pak Shek Kok station.

Notes

 
Tai Po District
Places in Hong Kong
Capes of Hong Kong
Restricted areas of Hong Kong red public minibus